George K. Karagiannidis is a Professor of electrical and computer engineering at the Department of Electrical and Computer Engineering of Aristotle University of Thessaloniki and a director of Digital Telecommunications Systems and Networks Laboratory. He was named Fellow of the Institute of Electrical and Electronics Engineers (IEEE) in 2014 for contributions to the performance analysis of wireless communication systems.

Karagiannidis was born in Pythagoreio, Samos Island, Greece. He received the University Diploma, after studying electrical and computer engineering for five years at the University of Patras in 1987 and in 1999 he got his Ph.D. from the same alma mater. From 2000 to 2004, he was a senior researcher at the Institute for Space Applications and Remote Sensing, National Observatory of Athens, Greece. Karagiannidis joined the faculty of Aristotle University of Thessaloniki in 2004, and since that time is a Professor in the Department of Electrical and Computer Engineering and a director of Digital Telecommunications Systems and Networks Laboratory. He also is an honorary professor at Southwest Jiaotong University in Chengdu, China. 

Karagiannidis, in 2004, found the Wireless Communications & Information Processing (WCIP) Group. WCIP belongs to Digital Telecommunications Systems and Networks Laboratory of the Electrical and Computer Engineering Department of Aristotle University of Thessaloniki, Greece. It was established in 2004 by Prof. George K. Karagiannidis as Wireless Communications Systems Group (WCSG). In August 2020 its name changed to Wireless Communications & Information Processing (WCIP) Group in order to cover new areas of research as signal processing for biomedical engineering, molecular communications, etc.

WCIP conducts fundamental and applied research in the broader fields of Telecommunications Systems and Signal Processing, both independently and by means of more than 30 international collaborations. In particular, the research interests and experience of the WCIP spans a variety of research areas:

 Wireless Communications (RF and Optical): Wireless Communications Theory, Wireless power transfer, Machine Learning for Wireless Communications, Wireless Security, Wireless Caching
 Communications and Signal Processing  for Biomedical Engineering: Machine Learning for Biomedical Engineering, Stochastic Processes in Molecular Biology, Molecular Communications

References

External links
George Karagiannidis

20th-century births
Living people
Greek computer scientists
Greek electrical engineers
University of Patras alumni
Academic staff of the Southwest Jiaotong University
Academic staff of the Aristotle University of Thessaloniki
Fellow Members of the IEEE
Year of birth missing (living people)
People from Samos